Larry McCarthy (born 1954) is a Gaelic games administrator who is current president of the GAA. A native of Bishopstown, in the city of Cork, he is a member of the Sligo football club in New York and has served with New York GAA in a number of capacities, including secretary, chairman and Central Council delegate.

Career
He is a university lecturer by profession, working at the Stillman School of Business at Seton Hall University in New Jersey since 1998.

At the GAA Congress in 2018, he was elected as one of the GAA's trustees while he was also part of the Strategic Review Committee during the same year under the stewardship of John Horan. Previously, he sat on the Towards 150 Committee under Aogán Ó Fearghail. He served on the Central Council for three years and was a member of the GAA Finance Committee. He became president-elect of the GAA in February 2020, the first overseas person to do so. He formally became president at the 2021 GAA Congress, held remotely due to COVID-19 restrictions. He flew into Ireland and isolated himself in Dublin (this being before quarantine was strictly enforced) ahead of formally taking on the presidency, during which he is based in Dublin.

Personal life
McCarthy received his secondary education at Coláiste Éamann Rís - Cork City. He attended Thomond College of Education for his Bachelor's Degree, has a Master's Degree from New York University, and a Ph.D. from The Ohio State University. He is married to Barbara, from Malahide, County Dublin, and together they have two grown sons, Conor and Shane.

References

External links
 https://www.irishcentral.com/sports/ny-gaa-larry-mccarthy 
 https://www.irishexaminer.com/sport/gaa/arid-40216640.html
 https://www.echolive.ie/corksport/arid-40233338.html
 https://www.irishtimes.com/sport/gaelic-games/gaa-congress-signals-greater-involvement-of-women-in-organisation-1.4497421
 https://www.irishtimes.com/sport/gaelic-games/new-gaa-president-delivers-on-gender-promise-in-first-committees-1.4497536

1954 births
Living people
Bishopstown Gaelic footballers
Bishopstown hurlers
Chairmen of county boards of the Gaelic Athletic Association
Dual players
Gaelic football in the United States
Lecturers
New York County Board administrators
Presidents of the Gaelic Athletic Association
Secretaries of county boards of the Gaelic Athletic Association